Real Madrid Balonmano was the handball section of Real Madrid C.F. The team participated in the Liga ASOBAL, the Spanish Handball National Championship, between the year of its creation –1952– until 1959 when the team was dissolved. Real Madrid took part of both handball codes existing by then, "eleven" (11 players per side) and "seven" (7 players).

History 
Created in 1952, Real Madrid Balonmano or Real Madrid BM was considered one of the Spanish handball most tough team that had competed at national level, along with its rival Atlético Madrid BM. The team won the 1952–53 season of Liga ASOBAL (the premier handball league of the country, organised by the "Asociación de Clubes de Balonmano de España" - ASOBAL).

Although Real Madrid made good campaigns in successive years, the club decided to close the section in 1959.

Home arenas

Titles
Liga ASOBAL (1): 1952–53

See also
 Real Madrid Rugby
 Real Madrid Voleibol

References

Spanish handball clubs
Defunct handball clubs
Real Madrid CF
1959 disestablishments in Spain
1952 establishments in Spain